Neil Harrison is a musician and dramatist.

Neil Harrison may also refer to:

Neil Harrison (umpire)
Neil Harrison (curler)